Bits and Pieces, originally Il cielo è sempre più blu, is a 1996 Italian comedy-drama film directed by Antonello Grimaldi. The title of the film is a reference to a song by Rino Gaetano. The film depicts several short stories set in a single day in Rome.

Cast 

Asia Argento 
Dario Argento
Luca Lionello 
Luca Barbareschi
Monica Bellucci
Claudio Bisio
Margherita Buy
Antonio Catania
Roberto Citran
Iaia Forte
Enrico Lo Verso
Daniele Luchetti
Ivano Marescotti
Margaret Mazzantini
Francesca Neri
Andrea Occhipinti
Silvio Orlando
Sergio Rubini
Gigio Alberti
Carlo Croccolo
Cecilia Dazzi
Giannina Facio
Nicola Farron
Alessandro Haber
Lucrezia Lante della Rovere
Marino Masé
Giulio Scarpati
Gabriele Salvatores
Monica Scattini
Gianmarco Tognazzi
Sergio Endrigo
Alessandro Baricco
Giuseppe Piccioni
Massimo Wertmüller

References

External links

1996 films
1996 comedy-drama films
Italian comedy-drama films
Films directed by Antonello Grimaldi
1990s Italian-language films
1990s Italian films